Margarita Michailidou (born 26 September 1987) is a Greek taekwondo practitioner. Michailidou won the silver medal in the women's welterweight (under 67 kg) division at the 2010 European Taekwondo Championships.

References

External links
 

1987 births
Living people
Greek female taekwondo practitioners
European Taekwondo Championships medalists
21st-century Greek women